The June deportation was a mass deportation by the Soviet Union of tens of thousands of people from the territories occupied in 1940–1941: Estonia, Latvia, Lithuania, occupied Poland (mostly present-day western Belarus and western Ukraine), and Moldavia.

This mass deportation was organized following the guidelines set by the NKVD with the USSR Interior People's Commissar Lavrentiy Beria as the senior executor. The official name of the top secret operation was “Resolution On the Eviction of the Socially Foreign Elements from the Baltic Republics, Western Ukraine, Western Belarus and Moldova”. The Soviet police, called "militsya", carried out the arrests with the collaboration of local Communist Party members.

The deportations
The deportation took place from May 22 to June 20, 1941, just before the invasion of the Soviet Union by Nazi Germany. However, the goal of the deportations was to remove political opponents of the Soviet government, not to strengthen security in preparation for the German attack.

The deportation took place a year after the occupation and annexation of the Baltic states and Bessarabia and Northern Bukovina and targeted "anti-Soviet elements" – former politicians, military personnel, policemen, wealthy industrialists and landowners, etc. In occupied Poland, it was the fourth wave of mass deportations and was intended to combat the "counter-revolutionary" Organization of Ukrainian Nationalists.

The procedure for the deportations was approved by Ivan Serov in the so-called Serov Instructions. People were deported without trials in whole families. Men were generally imprisoned and most of them died in Siberian prison camps (see Gulag); women and children were resettled in forced settlements in Omsk and Novosibirsk Oblasts, Krasnoyarsk and Altai Krais, and Kazakhstan. The mortality rate among the Estonian deportees was estimated at 60%.

Number of deportees
The number of deported people include:

In media

The June deportation has been the subject of several Baltic films from the 2010s. The 2013 Lithuanian film The Excursionist dramatised the events through the depiction of a 10-year-old girl who escapes from her camp. Estonia's 2014 In the Crosswind is an essay film based on the memoirs of a woman who was deported to Siberia, and is told through staged tableaux vivants filmed in black-and-white. Estonia's Ülo Pikkov also addressed the events in the animated short film Body Memory (Kehamälu) from 2012. Latvia's The Chronicles of Melanie was released in 2016 and is, just like In the Crosswind, based on the memoirs of a woman who experienced the deportation, but is told in a more conventional dramatic way.

See also 
 Soviet deportations from Estonia
 Soviet deportations from Latvia
 Soviet deportations from Lithuania
 Commemoration Day for the Victims of Communist Genocide

References

June 1941 events
1941 in Lithuania
Estonia in World War II
Latvia in World War II
People's Government of Lithuania
Soviet occupation of Eastern Poland 1939–1941
1941 in international relations
Forced migration in the Soviet Union
1941 in the Soviet Union
Deportation
Deportation from Latvia
Political and cultural purges
Occupation of the Baltic states
Anti-Estonian sentiment
Anti-Romanian sentiment
Anti-Latvian sentiment
Anti-Polish sentiment
Anti-Ukrainian sentiment
Estonian Soviet Socialist Republic
Latvian Soviet Socialist Republic
Lithuanian Soviet Socialist Republic